Sodium p-toluenesulfonate is an organic compound with the formula .  It is white, water-soluble solid.  It is produced by the neutralization toluenesulfonic acid with sodium hydroxide.  It is also a common product from the reactions of sodium-based reagents with toluenesulfonates.

Heating this salt in strong base results in desulfonation, giving, after acid workup, p-cresol.

References

Sulfonyl groups
Leaving groups
Sulfonates